If 60's Were 90's is an album by techno-dance band Beautiful People featuring numerous samples from Jimi Hendrix songs. It spawned the hits "Rilly Groovy," which reached number three on the Hot Dance Club Songs chart and the title track "If 60's Were 90's", which reached number 74 on the UK Singles Chart and number five on the Hot Dance Club Songs chart.

Critical reception
The Los Angeles Times called it an "inspired piece of grave-digging".

Track listing
All songs written by Du Kane and Luke Baldry.

References

1994 debut albums
Sire Records albums
RCA Records albums
Jimi Hendrix
Continuum Records albums